= Tiroler Volksschauspiele =

Theatre in Austria

Coordinates: 47.307267°N 11.0721°E

Tiroler Volksschauspiele is a theatre in Austria.
